Norman Stansfield Cornish (18 November 1919 – 1 August 2014) was an English mining artist.

Career
Cornish was the last surviving member of the "Pitman's Academy" art school at the Spennymoor Settlement in County Durham in North East England. A former miner, he was known for his pictures of mining community life. Other artistic contemporaries of Cornish from the Spennymoor Settlement included Herbert Dees, Robert Heslop and Tom McGuinness.

Cornish started work as a miner in 1933, at the age of 14. He continued to work as a miner even after his painting career was established, until he retired as a miner and became a full-time artist in 1966.

Cornish was granted an honorary Master of Arts degree by Newcastle University in 1974, and an honorary doctorate by Sunderland University in 2012. He was a contemporary and friend of the artist L. S. Lowry.

He was married to Sarah. They had two children, John and Ann.

Legacy
To mark the 100th anniversary of Cornish's birth, the Bowes Museum organised the first "major retrospective" of Cornish's work. The exhibition was scheduled to run from November 2019 to February 2020. An exhibition of some of Cornish's 269 sketchbooks was scheduled for display over the same period at Durham University's Palace Green Library.

In 2019, a 'Norman Cornish Trail' was created in Spennymoor to allow people to follow a 1.5 mile route to view many of the scenes painted by Cornish.

A room within the art gallery at Spennymoor Town Hall has been dedicated to exhibiting paintings by Cornish.

References

External links 
 Artist's website
 

1919 births
2014 deaths
English miners
Pitman painters